Juana Capdevielle (12 August 1905 – 18 August 1936) was a Spanish educator and librarian.

Biography
Juana Capdevielle was born in Madrid and went to Pamplona to study at a high school. She moved back to Madrid in order to pursue a university education and later travelled to France, Germany, Switzerland and Belgium. After she married Francisco Pérez Carballo, governor of La Coruña, she moved to Galicia. Her husband was arrested and shot by the rebel military in July 1936 at the beginning of the Spanish Civil War. Shortly thereafter, on 18 August, she was arrested by the Guardia Civil. On the following morning her body was found in Rábade; she had been raped and subsequently killed. Juana was pregnant at the time of her murder.

See also
List of people executed by Francoist Spain 
White Terror (Spain)

References

External links 
 Cultura Galega - Juana Capdevielle, paseada en 1936
 Asociación para a Dignificación das Vítimas do Fascismo

People from Madrid
People executed by Francoist Spain
Spanish librarians
Spanish women librarians
1905 births
1936 deaths